The 2018 Kategoria e Tretë was the 15th official season of the Albanian football fourth division since its establishment. The season began on 11 February 2018. There were 7 teams competing this season. Term gained promotion to the 2018-19 Kategoria e Dytë. Rubiku won their first Kategoria e Tretë title.

Changes from last season

Team changes

From Third Division
Promoted to Albanian Second Division:
 FC Klosi
 Spartaku

Stadia by capacity and locations

League standings

References

4
Albania
Kategoria e Tretë seasons